Kütten is a district in the municipality Petersberg, in the Saalekreis district of Saxony-Anhalt, Germany. Until the formation of a unified municipality of Petersberg on 1 January 2010, Kütten was an independent village in the administrative community of Götschetal-Petersberg. The last mayor of Kütten, until 2010, was Heinz Pohl.

Notable people 
 Christian Reuter (1665 – c. 1712), a German author

External links 
 Official Kütten

Former municipalities in Saxony-Anhalt
Petersberg, Saxony-Anhalt